Argentinoeme pseudobscura is a species of beetle in the family Cerambycidae. It was described by Di Iorio in 1995.

References

Oemini
Beetles described in 1995